Harakian or Harkian may refer to:
 Harkian, Gilan
 Harakian, West Azerbaijan